Léna Bühler (born 9 July 1997) is a Swiss female racing driver currently set to compete in the 2023 F1 Academy Championship, driving for ART Grand Prix. She is a full member of the Sauber Academy.

Career

Karting 
Having competed in BMX at European level in her childhood, Bühler took up racing at the relatively late age of 17. She made her karting debut in the Swiss Karting Championship in 2017, where she finished 14th. She raced karts for the next two years, finishing fourth and third in the Swiss Championship in 2018 and 2019 respectively.

Lower formulae 
Bühler made her car racing debut in the 2020 F4 Spanish Championship with Drivex School. She starred in qualifying on occasion, most notably making the front row at the Circuito del Jarama, but could only manage a best race finish of 5th. She scored 23 points and finished the season 15th in the standings, as the tenth-highest rookie.

Formula Regional 
In February 2021 it was announced that Bühler would partner Hadrien David, Isack Hadjar and Zane Maloney at R-ace GP in the Formula Regional European Championship, as the first female entrant of the rebranded series. However, she injured her hand in a pre-season test and could not attend the opening round. After making her debut at the second round in Barcelona, Bühler endured a very difficult season, achieving a best finish of 20th and coming 38th in the standings, last of all the full-time drivers. She later admitted that she had struggled a lot physically as a result of the injury, stating that she "lacked a little strength, resistance over the duration of the races".

Bühler remained with the team for the 2022 season, partnering David, Lorenzo Fluxá and Gabriel Bortoleto, while also racing part-time in the Asian Championship during the winter. Her performances improved immediately, as she finished all the races inside the top 20, with a best result of 12th at the final round in Abu Dhabi.

F1 Academy 
On 2 February 2023, Bühler was confirmed to be the first driver to compete in the newly launched all-female F1 Academy series, racing for ART Grand Prix in 2023.

Karting record

Karting career summary

Racing record

Racing career summary 

* Season still in progress.

Complete F4 Spanish Championship results 
(key) (Races in bold indicate pole position) (Races in italics indicate fastest lap)

Complete F4 UAE Championship results 
(key) (Races in bold indicate pole position) (Races in italics indicate fastest lap)

* Season still in progress.

Complete Formula Regional European Championship results 
(key) (Races in bold indicate pole position) (Races in italics indicate fastest lap)

Complete Formula Regional Asian Championship results
(key) (Races in bold indicate pole position) (Races in italics indicate the fastest lap of top ten finishers)

References

External links 
 
 

1997 births
Living people
Swiss racing drivers
Swiss female racing drivers
Spanish F4 Championship drivers
F1 Academy drivers
Formula Regional European Championship drivers
Formula Regional Asian Championship drivers
Drivex drivers
R-ace GP drivers
UAE F4 Championship drivers
ART Grand Prix drivers
Sauber Motorsport drivers